The Tenniöjoki is a river in Russia and Finland. It begins in Murmansk Oblast in Russia from where it flows into Finnish territory in Lapland region. It is a tributary of Kemijoki and one of its tributaries is Kuolajoki which also begins on the Russian side of the border and ends in Finland.

It starts in a swampy area by the slopes of the Minkeliminturi mountain.

See also
List of rivers in Finland

Further reading
 Suuri tietosanakirja. WSOY, 2001. . 
 Tietojätti. Gummerus, 1985. . 
 Keski- ja Ylä-Kemijoen kalatalousselvityksiä vuosina 1989–2000, s. 34–35. Lapin ympäristökeskus, 2006. .

External links

Rivers of Finland
Rivers of Murmansk Oblast
Kemijoki basin
Rivers of Salla
International rivers of Europe